The 1997 Dura Lube 500 was the 31st and penultimate stock car race of the 1997 NASCAR Winston Cup Series and the 10th iteration of the event. The race was held on Sunday, November 2, Avondale, Arizona at Phoenix International Raceway, a 1-mile (1.6 km) permanent low-banked tri-oval race track. The race took the scheduled 312 laps to complete. At race's end, Robert Yates Racing driver Dale Jarrett would manage to dominate the late stages of the race to take his 15th career NASCAR Winston Cup Series victory and his seventh and final victory of the season. To fill out the top three, Penske Racing South driver Rusty Wallace and Petty Enterprises driver Bobby Hamilton would finish second and third, respectively.

Going into the final race of the season, the 1997 NAPA 500 at Atlanta Motor Speedway, a tight battle between the three mathematical eligible drivers for the championship, Jeff Gordon, Dale Jarrett, and Mark Martin was set. Gordon had 4,598 points, 77 points ahead of Jarrett and 87 points ahead of Martin. If Gordon was able to finish 18th or higher in the race, Gordon would automatically win the championship.

Background 

Phoenix International Raceway – also known as PIR – is a one-mile, low-banked tri-oval race track located in Avondale, Arizona. It is named after the nearby metropolitan area of Phoenix. The motorsport track opened in 1964 and currently hosts two NASCAR race weekends annually. PIR has also hosted the IndyCar Series, CART, USAC and the Rolex Sports Car Series. The raceway is currently owned and operated by International Speedway Corporation.

The raceway was originally constructed with a 2.5 mi (4.0 km) road course that ran both inside and outside of the main tri-oval. In 1991 the track was reconfigured with the current 1.51 mi (2.43 km) interior layout. PIR has an estimated grandstand seating capacity of around 67,000. Lights were installed around the track in 2004 following the addition of a second annual NASCAR race weekend.

Entry list 

 (R) denotes rookie driver.

Qualifying 
Qualifying was split into two rounds. The first round was held on Friday, October 31, at 3:30 PM EST. Each driver would have one lap to set a time. During the first round, the top 25 drivers in the round would be guaranteed a starting spot in the race. If a driver was not able to guarantee a spot in the first round, they had the option to scrub their time from the first round and try and run a faster lap time in a second round qualifying run, held on Saturday, November 1, at 1:00 PM EST. As with the first round, each driver would have one lap to set a time. Positions 26-38 would be decided on time, and depending on who needed it, the 39th thru either the 42nd, 43rd, or 44th position would be based on provisionals. Four spots are awarded by the use of provisionals based on owner's points. The fifth is awarded to a past champion who has not otherwise qualified for the race. If no past champion needs the provisional, the field would be limited to 42 cars. If a champion needed it, the field would expand to 43 cars. If the race was a companion race with the NASCAR Winston West Series, four spots would be determined by NASCAR Winston Cup Series provisionals, while the final two spots would be given to teams in the Winston West Series, leaving the field at 44 cars.

In an obscure ruling, Hendrick Motorsports driver Ricky Craven would earn the 43rd spot based on an owner's points provisional, a spot which at the time was usually reserved to a driver who is a past champion who had not otherwise qualified into the field. At the time, if a champion did not need the spot, the field was only limited to 42 cars. Despite Craven using up all of his seven owner's provisionals within the 1997 season, he had placed the car within the top 38 within the owner's points, thus qualifying himself on an owner's points provisional.

Four drivers would fail to qualify: Wally Dallenbach Jr., Jack Sprague, Morgan Shepherd, and Gary Bradberry.

Full qualifying results

Race results

References 

1997 NASCAR Winston Cup Series
NASCAR races at Phoenix Raceway
November 1997 sports events in the United States
1997 in sports in Arizona